Sciota subcaesiella, the locust leafroller moth, is a species of moth of the  family Pyralidae. It is found in North America, including Maryland, New Jersey, Oklahoma, Iowa, North Carolina, South Carolina, Georgia, Alabama, Mississippi, Maine, New Hampshire, New York, Massachusetts, Pennsylvania, the District of Columbia, Virginia, Tennessee, Illinois, Missouri, Arkansas, Nova Scotia and Ontario.

The larvae feed on Robinia hispida, Robinia pseudoacacia, Robinia viscosa and Robinia nana.

References

External links
mothphotographersgroup

Moths described in 1860
Phycitini
Moths of North America